Maputsoe is a town located in the northern district of Leribe in Lesotho; it shares a border-post with Ficksburg in the eastern Free State. With a population of 55,541.

The Irish NGO 'Action Lesotho', which works in Maputsoe, was set up by politician Mannete Ramali, whilst she was Ambassador to Ireland.

Villages
Maputsoe includes the villages of Mathata, Ha Nyenye (Ha Maputsoe, Khomo-lia-oela, Ha Chonapase, Phukalla, Mohalalitoe and Ha Maqele), Ha Motlalehi and Ha Chaka

Rivers
Mohokare

References

Populated places in Leribe District
Lesotho–South Africa border crossings